The Maurine is a  tributary of the Stepenitz in the extreme northwest corner of Mecklenburg-Vorpommern, Germany.

Course of the river
The Maurine originates between Carlow and Groß Rünz in the southwest of the district Nordwestmecklenburg in a forest and meadow area 45 m above mean sea level.

The difference in height from the source to the delta is approximately 45 m.

External links
 Stepenitz and Maurine Lowlands

Rivers of Mecklenburg-Western Pomerania
Rivers of Germany